Cutting Class is a 1989 American black comedy slasher film directed by Rospo Pallenberg in his directorial debut, written by Steve Slavkin, and starring Donovan Leitch, Jill Schoelen, Brad Pitt, Roddy McDowall, and Martin Mull. It was Pitt's first major role.

The film was released direct-to-video by Republic Pictures on July 17, 1989.

Plot 

The film opens with a paperboy delivering newspapers. A paper is delivered to Paula Carson's house. Paula is approached by her father, Bill, who is the district attorney, who has planned a hunting trip. He warns Paula to do her homework, not to allow boys in the house, and most importantly not to cut class. Paula then puts the newspaper in the bin, showing its headline: "Boy who killed father released from Mental Asylum."

Bill Carson drives to the swamps for his hunting trip. As he takes shots into the air, someone is hiding nearby and holding a bow and arrows. The person calls over to Bill Carson and fires an arrow into him. Bill cries out and then falls down to the ground. Throughout the rest of the movie, there are cuts to Bill struggling to get help (including asking a dog to yell for help) as well as crawl his way back home.

Meanwhile, Dwight Ingalls enters class late after avoiding two accidents on his ride to school. Dwight is questioned by his teacher, Mr. Conklin, and a boy sitting next to Dwight whispers the answers to him. Dwight tells him to shut up when he teases Dwight for not knowing what H2O is.

Later, Colleen and Paula are taking out gym equipment. Paula walks past a set of bow and arrows and notices a leaf hanging off one of the arrow. Paula picks the leaf off and then eats it. Meanwhile, Brian is told to climb a rope by the P.E. coach, but Dwight caused him to fall.

At a hot dog stand, Colleen, Paula, and Gary are waiting for Dwight. Brian approaches, and Colleen insults him before asserting that Brian has a crush on Paula. Dwight then pulls up in his car and starts talking to Paula. He asks her to go to her house, as her father is away, which would give them the opportunity to be alone. Dwight then goes to buy Paula a hot dog, but he is beaten by Brian who hands her one and says, "You had that look." When Dwight returns, he tells Paula to get in the car and makes it clear to Brian that they are not friends anymore and to leave him and Paula alone. They all then drive off in Dwight's car.

Brian and Paula nevertheless become friends, and she starts to trust him. Dwight warns her to stay away from him. A teacher is murdered in the copyroom, and the students notice that the killer made copies of the killing on the copy machine. The teacher's face is shown smashed into the copy machine glass along with a ring on the killer's finger. The ring belongs to Dwight. Soon they think that Dwight (Brad Pitt) is the killer instead of Brian.

Brian tries to kill Paula, Dwight, and a math teacher in the school, and the janitor happens to be around at the time. Every classroom they run into, Brian starts talking to Paula and the math teacher through the PA in the principal's office. Paula still thinks that Dwight is the killer, and she is still running from him. Soon Brian goes into the classroom after hacking the math teacher to death. Dwight enters and gets Brian off of Paula, and they run out to the shop class and hide after Brian exclaims, "YOU'RE A YANKEE DOODLE DANDY TOO; YOU TWO MUST KILL OR DIE!" Brian knows they are in there, so he follows them while locking them in and turning on all the equipment.

Brian corners Dwight and puts his head in a vice and points a drill towards his face. Paula ends up striking Brian in the head with a claw hammer, making him fall onto a moving circular saw, which goes right through his torso as Paula rescues Dwight. They leave the school and are in Dwight's car when, all of a sudden, they see Paula's dad as he is falling down the hill into the road. Paula points out that it is her dad, but Dwight cannot stop because Brian cut the brakes earlier. They swerve and miss hitting Paula's dad. All he says is, "Shouldn't you be in school? You're not cutting class, I hope!" The movie ends with the camera's freezing on Paula's face.

Cast

Donovan Leitch as Brian Woods
Jill Schoelen as Paula Carson
Brad Pitt as Dwight Ingalls
Roddy McDowall as Mr. Dante
Martin Mull as William Carson III
Brenda James as Colleen (as Brenda Lynn Klemme)
Mark Barnet as Gary
Tom Ligon as Mr. Ingalls
Robert Glaudini as Shultz
Eric Boles as Mr. Glynn
Dirk Blocker as Coach Harris
Nancy Fish as Mrs. Knocht
Robert Machray as Mr. Conklin
David Clarke as Crusty Old Man
Norman Alden as Officer Fondulac

Reception 
The movie was received negatively by critics. Film Threat, while not particular positive towards the film, called it "good campy fun with some of the dumbest scenes you can grab from a slasher of this decade." It has an approval rating of 14% on review aggregator website Rotten Tomatoes, based on 7 reviews.

References

External links 

 
 
 

1989 films
1989 directorial debut films
1989 horror films
1980s comedy horror films
1980s high school films
1989 independent films
1980s serial killer films
1980s slasher films
1980s teen comedy films
1980s teen horror films
American comedy horror films
American high school films
American independent films
American slasher films
American teen comedy films
American teen horror films
Films produced by William N. Panzer
Films shot in Los Angeles County, California
1980s English-language films
1980s American films